Ana Razdorov-Lyø (born July 15, 1973 in Yugoslavia) is a Serbian born Dutch former handballplayer. She has played for both the Dutch and the Serbian national team. She has played 70 games for the Netherlands. Among the clubs, she has played for are the Danish clubs Odense hf, GOG, Kolding IF, SK Århus and Slagelse FH. In 2010, she became lady's coach in SUS-Ullerslev. She is currently assistant coach for Team Esbjerg

She is married with the Danish former volleyball player Peter Lyø. They have three children together.

References 
 About Ana Razdorov-Lyø on EHF's Champions League site

Dutch female handball players
Yugoslav female handball players
Serbian female handball players
1973 births
Living people